Shawn McLaws (born March 9, 1993) is an American professional soccer player who plays as a defender.

Career

High school
McLaws attended Deer Creek High School in Edmond, OK where he lettered in football and soccer. McLaws graduated in 2011.

Early career
McLaws spent four  years at Coastal Carolina University between 2011 and 2014. In his four  years with Coastal Carolina he made 89 appearances and scored 1 goal and provided 17 assists. In his last year he was named Big South Defensive Player of the Year. While at college, McLaws appeared for USL PDL club Ocean City Nor'easters during their 2013 and 2014 seasons, serving as team captain in 2014.

New York Red Bulls
McLaws was selected with the 59th overall pick in the 2015 MLS SuperDraft by New York Red Bulls. On February 21, 2015 McLaws appeared in his first match for New York, a 1-0 preseason victory over Oklahoma City Energy FC. He officially joined the club on March 5, 2015 

McLaws was loaned to affiliate side New York Red Bulls II during the 2015 season and made his debut as a starter for the side on April 4, 2015, scoring his first professional goal in the 4-1 victory over Toronto FC II.  His performance against Toronto FC II earned McClaws USL Team of the Week honors.

On February 12, 2016, McLaws was waived by the Red Bulls.

References

External links
newyorkredbulls.com player profile
oceancityfc.com player profile
Coastal Carolina player profile

1993 births
Living people
American soccer players
Coastal Carolina Chanticleers men's soccer players
Ocean City Nor'easters players
New York Red Bulls players
New York Red Bulls II players
Penn FC players
Association football defenders
Sportspeople from Edmond, Oklahoma
Soccer players from Oklahoma
New York Red Bulls draft picks
USL League Two players
USL Championship players